Parmotrema aberrans is a species of lichen in the family Parmeliaceae. It is found in the Neotropics, from Mexico to Paraguay. The species was originally described by Edvard August Vainio in 1890 as a form of Parmelia xanthina. In 1958, Henry Nicollon des Abbayes promoted it to species level within Parmelia. Luciana Canêz and Marcelo Marcelli transferred it to Parmotrema in 2008.

Characteristics of Parmotrema aberrans include a greenish-yellow thallus (due to the presence of usnic acid), continuous cilia on the margins, cylindrical isidia with cilia, and the presence of gyrophoric acid in the medulla. Parmotrema xanthinum is quite similar in appearance and morphology, but lacks medullary gyrophoric acid.

The lichenicolous fungus Macroskyttea parmotrematis (Helotiales), reported as a new genus and species in 2015, inhabits the thalli of Parmotrema aberrans (as well as P. ultralucens).

See also
List of Parmotrema species

References

Lichen species
Fungi described in 1890
Lichens of Mexico
Lichens of South America
aberrans
Taxa named by Edvard August Vainio